Aliđerce is a village located in the municipality of Preševo, Serbia. According to the 2002 census, the village has a population of 1033 people. Of these, 1022 (98.93%) were ethnic Albanians, 1 Muslim (0.09 %), 1 Bosniak (0.09 %) and 9 others (0.87%).

References

Populated places in Pčinja District
Albanian communities in Serbia